Upper Lillooet Provincial Park is a provincial park in British Columbia, Canada. The 19,996-hectare park was established on July 28, 1997, under the National Parks Act.

See also
Mount Meager massif
Lillooet River

External links 
Official park website from the Canadian Ministry of Environment
  

Provincial parks of British Columbia
Pemberton Valley